Matilda of Savoy (– 3 December 1157/58) was Queen of Portugal, after her marriage to King Afonso Henriques, the first sovereign of Portugal, whom she married in 1146.

Origins 
She was the second or third daughter of Amadeus III, Count of Savoy and Maurienne, and Mahaut of Albon (the sister of Guigues IV of Albon, "le Dauphin"). One of her aunts, Adelaide of Maurienne, was queen consort as the wife of King Louis VI of France, and one of her great-granduncles was Pope Callixtus II whose papacy lasted from 1119 until 1124, the year of his death.

Possible reasons for her marriage
Her father had joined the Second Crusade and this could have been one of the reasons why she was chosen as the consort of Portugal's first monarch. Such an alliance would contribute to expelling the Moors from Portuguese territory and would also show the new King's independence by selecting a wife outside the sphere of influence of the Kingdom of León. It is also possible that he was not able to select one of the infantas from the neighboring Iberian kingdoms due to reasons of consanguinity. The wedding could have also been suggested by Guido de Vico, the papal representative in the Iberian Peninsula who had been one of the witnesses of the Treaty of Zamora in 1143.

Life as queen consort
Mafalda first appears with her husband on 23 May 1146 confirming a donation that had been made previously by her mother-in-law, Teresa of León, to the Order of Cluny. She was very devoted to the Cistercian Order and founded the Monasterio of Costa in Guimarães and a hospital/hostel for pilgrims, the poor and the sick in Canaveses.  She stipulated in her will that this hospital was to be kept always clean, that it should be furnished with good and clean beds and that, if any of those lodged at the institution should die there, three masses were to be celebrated for the salvation of their souls.

Walter Map, in his work, De nugis curialium,  tells a story that "the King of Portugal now living", almost certainly Afonso, had been convinced by evil counselors to murder his pregnant wife out of misplaced jealousy. However, there is no other authority for this account, and it is not generally accepted.

Death and burial
Queen Mafalda died in Coimbra on 3 December 1157 or 1158 and was buried at the Monastery of Santa Cruz where her husband, who survived her by more than twenty-seven years, was later interred. She was survived by six of her seven children, only three of whom, infantes Sancho, Urraca and Theresa, would reach adulthood.

Marriage and issue
Although the Annales D. Alfonsi Portugallensium Regis, record that the wedding of Alfonso and Mafalda was celebrated in 1145, it was not until a year later, in May 1146, when they both appear in royal charters. Historian José Mattoso refers to another source, Noticia sobre a Conquista de Santarém (News on the Conquest of Santarém), which states that the city was taken on 15 May 1147, less than a year after their marriage. Since at that time no wedding ceremony could be performed during Lent, Mattoso suggests that the marriage could have taken place in March or April of 1146, possibly on Easter Sunday which fell on 31 March of that year. The groom was almost thirty-eight years old and the bride was about twenty-one years old. 
The children of this marriage were:

 Henry (5 March 1147– June 1155), named after his paternal grandfather, Henry, he died when he was only eight years old. Despite being just a child  he represented his father at a council in Toledo at the age of three. He died in 1155, shortly after the birth of his brother Sancho.
 Urraca (1148– 1211), married King Ferdinand II of León and was the mother of King Alfonso IX. The marriage was subsequently annulled in 1171 or 1172 and she retired in Zamora, one of the villas that she had received as part of her arras,  and later at the Monastery of Santa María in Wamba, Valladolid where she was buried.;
 Theresa (1151– 1218), Countess consort of Flanders due to her marriage to Philip I and Duchess consort of Burgundy through her second marriage to Odo III;
 Mafalda (1153– after 1162). In January 1160, her father and Ramón Berenguer IV, Count of Barcelona, negotiated the marriage of Mafalda to Alfonso, future King Alfonso II of Aragon who at that time was three or four years old. After the death of Ramón Berenguer IV in the summer of 1162, King Ferdinand II of León convinced his widow, Queen  Petronilla, to cancel the infante's wedding plans with Mafalda and for Alfonso to marry instead Sancha, daughter Alfonso VII of León and his second wife Queen Richeza of Poland. Mafalda died in her childhood at an unrecorded date.
 Sancho, the future King Sancho I of Portugal (11 November 1154– 26 March 1211). He was baptised with the name of Martin for having been born on the saint's feast day.;
 John (1156 – 25 August 1164); and
 Sancha (1157 – 14 February 1166/67), born ten days before the death of her mother, Sancha died before reaching the age of ten. on the 14th of February according to the death registry at the Monastery of Santa Cruz (Coimbra) where she was buried.

Notes

References

Bibliography

 

 
 
 

|-

1120s births
1158 deaths
12th-century people from Savoy
12th-century Portuguese people
12th-century Portuguese women
Matilda
Portuguese queens consort
12th-century Italian women